Aleya Afroz is a Awami League politician and a member of the Bangladesh parliament from a reserved seat.

Career
Afroz was elected to parliament from reserved seat as an Awami League candidate in 1996. She is the President of Rights Jessore.

References

Awami League politicians
Living people
Women members of the Jatiya Sangsad
7th Jatiya Sangsad members
Year of birth missing (living people)
20th-century Bangladeshi women politicians